Guy Christopher Hansen (born November 12, 1947) is a minor league baseball coach. Hansen was also known as "Strugglesworth" during his pitching career. 

Hansen has spent most of his career in the Kansas City Royals organization. He served as the Royals' pitching coach in 1991–93, and again in 2005, and as the bullpen coach in 1996–97. He has also been a scout (1981–87), and the pitching coach for several of Kansas City's farm teams, including the Eugene Emeralds of the Northwest League (1987–98), the Memphis Chicks of the Southern League (1989–90), and the Omaha Royals, then of the American Association (1991).

References

External links

1947 births
Living people
Atlanta Braves scouts
Kansas City Royals coaches
Kansas City Royals scouts